The Macedonian Women's Football Cup is the annual cup competition of women's football teams in Macedonia.

List of finals
The list of finals:

By titles
Only known titles.

References

External links
Football Federation of Macedonia
makfudbal.com

Women's Cup
Mac
Recurring sporting events established in 2003
2003 establishments in the Republic of Macedonia